Andrew Putman (born October 22, 1979) is an American mathematician at the University of Notre Dame. His research fields include geometric group theory and low-dimensional topology.

Putman earned his bachelor's degree from Rice University. In 2007, he obtained his doctorate from the University of Chicago, under the supervision of Benson Farb. He was a C. L. E. Moore Instructor at MIT from 2007-2010, and then served on the faculty at Rice from 2010-2016.  He then moved to Notre Dame, where he is currently the Notre Dame Professor of Topology.

In 2018, he became a fellow of the American Mathematical Society. In 2014, there was a Seminar Bourbaki talk by Aurélien Djament on Putman's work. Further, in 2013, Putman received the Sloan Research Fellowship and a National Science Foundation CAREER Award.

References

External links

1979 births
Living people
21st-century American mathematicians
University of Notre Dame faculty
Rice University alumni
Rice University faculty
University of Chicago alumni
Fellows of the American Mathematical Society
Sloan Research Fellows
Topologists
Group theorists
Massachusetts Institute of Technology School of Science faculty